The Nueva Ecija Patriots were a professional basketball team in the now-defunct Metropolitan Basketball Association from 1999 to 2001. The Patriots were derived from the province's origin during the Philippine revolution against the Spanish colonial rule at the latter end of the 19th century.

History
In 1999, the MBA added three more franchises to increase their number of clubs to 15 with Nueva Ecija, San Juan, Metro Manila and Surigao. Under former national team coach Joe Lipa, the Patriots will parade Fil-American Alex Crisano, who played in Cortez High School back in the United States and was a slamdunk champion in a Filipino community in New York. Former Letran Knight Willie Miller, who at that time had an existing contract playing for Tanduay Rhum in the Philippine Basketball League. Aside from Crisano and Miller, there is the youthful Rensy Bajar, Julius Vinuya, three-point specialist John Verrayo, Ferdinand Ninoc, the Chaneco brothers Joel and Jerome and comebacking cagers Ramil Cruz and Dodong Postanes. The Patriots played their home games in Araullo University Gym.

The Patriots lost in the first-ever match against fellow expansion team San Juan Knights at the Cuneta Astrodome. The Patriots struggled throughout the 1999 season despite Miller ranking among the top 10 leaders in scoring, Crisano was later traded to the Pangasinan Waves as they held the third-worst record in the league at 7–23 win-loss slate.

In 2000, Nueva Ecija improved its record by three games but missed the playoffs for the second straight year with a 10–16 record. A year later, Miller left the team to join the Philippine Basketball Association. The Patriots went 3–11 both phases of the tournament.

After the season, the Patriots ceased operations and did not return for the 2002 season.

1999 Roster

Other notable players
Bob Allen
Francis Aquino
Billy Bansil
Dave Bautista
Oliver Bunyi
Bernard de Guia
Andy de Guzman
Jonathan de Guzman
Ariel Garcia
Eric Gascon
Rolof Liangco
Matthew Makalintal
Cornelio "Sonny" Manucat
Bryant Punsalan
Dexter Racho

References

External links
Servinio's Sports Etc
mbametro.blogspot.com

Metropolitan Basketball Association teams
Basketball teams established in 1999
Basketball teams disestablished in 2001
Sports in Nueva Ecija
1999 establishments in the Philippines